The Indian startup ecosystem originated with software services startups serving Indian software needs, and later expanding to exporting software services. The next generation of Indian product startups had founders who had worked in these services startups, or were moving back from the Silicon Valley, having worked in product startups in the US. Venture capital investments were kicked off by TDICI, a government entity, followed by other investors from Silicon Valley.

The third wave of startups were founded in the dot-com era, included marketplaces, e-commerce vendors, and portals. The fourth wave started around 2007–2008, and comprised e-commerce, logistics, marketplaces, and advertising startups. These startups are regularly covered by the online media platforms, which focus on start-up coverage like 'YourStory' and  NextBigWhat'.

In the 2010s, India saw a wave of SaaS companies being founded in India with products mainly sold to customers in the US and Europe. Notable examples include Zoho, Postman, Chargebee, BrowserStack, CleverTap and Whatfix.

List of notable events

See also
Information technology in India

References

Software industry in India